Martin Toporek (born 15 February 1961 in Vienna) is an Austrian racewalker. He represented his country at two consecutive Summer Olympics, in 1980 and 1984. In addition, he won a bronze medal at the 1982 European Indoor Championships.

In 1996 he tested positive for illegal stimulants substances, Methylephedrin, Ephedrin, und Pseudoephedrin, and was banned for three months.

International competitions

Personal bests
Outdoor
5000 metres walk – 16:03.50 (Südstadt 1979)
5 kilometres walk – 28:21 (Hlohovec 2013)
10,000 metres walk – 41:53.59 (Schwechat 1981)
10 kilometres walk – 42:02 (Kremniza 1980)
20 kilometres walk – 1:25:32 (Bergen 1986) NR
30 kilometres walk – 3:46:03 (Vienna 2011)
50 kilometres walk – 4:20:10 (Dudince 1984)
Indoor
3000 metres walk – 11:12.0 (Vienna 1983)
5000 metres walk – 19:37.57 (Vienna 1986) NR

References

All-Athletics profile
OELV profile

1961 births
Living people
Austrian male racewalkers
Athletes (track and field) at the 1980 Summer Olympics
Athletes (track and field) at the 1984 Summer Olympics
Olympic athletes of Austria
Athletes from Vienna
Doping cases in athletics
Austrian sportspeople in doping cases